David Katoatau (born 17 July 1984) is an I-Kiribati weightlifter who received international press attention due to dance routines he performed following his lifts at the 2016 Summer Olympics, in order to bring attention to the impact of climate change on Kiribati.

Career 
In 2007, Katoatau appeared at the 2007 World Weightlifting Championships in Chiang Mai, Thailand, where he ranked 37th in the 85 kg with a total lift of 281 kg; as well as at the 2008 Oceania Weightlifting Championships in Auckland, New Zealand, where he ranked 4th with a total of 292 kg.

Katoatau represented Kiribati in weightlifting at the 2008 Summer Olympics in Beijing, China, where he also served as the national flag bearer at the opening ceremony. He ultimately ranked 15th in the 85 kg category, with a total of 313 kg.

In 2012, Katoatau became the first I-Kiribati sportsperson to qualify on merit for the Olympic Games, rather than through receiving a wildcard invitation, when he competed at the 94 kg event at the 2012 Summer Olympics in London, United Kingdom. He finished 17th, with a total lift of 325 kg, and again served as Kiribati's flagbearer.

At the 2014 Commonwealth Games in Glasgow, United Kingdom, Katoatau won gold in the 105 kg group A, marking the first ever Commonwealth Games medal for Kiribati. 

In 2016, Katoatau gained international press attention for dance routines he performed after completing clean and jerk lifts at the Summer Olympics in Rio de Janeiro, Brazil, which he stated he did in order to raise awareness of global warming on Kiribati.

Personal life and activism 
Katoatau was born in Nonouti, Kiribati, and grew up in Nauru, where his father worked in the phosphate industry. When he was 16, he moved to Apia, Samoa, to train at the Oceania Weightlifting Institute, due in part of the lack of appropriate training facilities in Kiribati. As of 2016, Katoatau lived in Nouméa, New Caledonia, where the Institute is now based

Katoatau is a climate activist, and has called for international action to prevent Kiribati from "disappearing" due to rising sea levels. In 2015, Katoatau's family home in Buota was destroyed by rising tides; at the 2014 Commonwealth Games, Katoatau and his then-coach Paul Coffa had wrote an open letter raising attention to the issue of homes being lost to rising sea levels in Kiribati. Katoatau believes that Kiribati lacks the resources to fight climate change and needs the support of the international community.

Katoatau has cited Marcus Stephen, the first Nauruan to win gold at the Commonwealth Games, as among his inspirations. His younger brother, Ruben Katoatau, is also a weightlifter.

Olympics statistics

See also 
Kiribati at the 2008 Summer Olympics

Note

References

External links
 
 Pacific Magazine: Kiribati Sends Three Athletes To Beijing Olympics 
 Athlete Biography at beijing2008

1984 births
Living people
Weightlifters at the 2008 Summer Olympics
Weightlifters at the 2012 Summer Olympics
Weightlifters at the 2016 Summer Olympics
Olympic weightlifters of Kiribati
I-Kiribati male weightlifters
People from Nonouti
Weightlifters at the 2014 Commonwealth Games
Weightlifters at the 2010 Commonwealth Games
Commonwealth Games gold medallists for Kiribati
Commonwealth Games medallists in weightlifting
Medallists at the 2014 Commonwealth Games